Stanisław Kazimierz Dąmbski (or Dąbski) (born about 1638, died 15 December 1700 in Kraków), was a politically powerful Polish prelate and king-maker. He was in turn, bishop of Chełm, Łuck, Płock, Kujawy and finally, bishop of Krakow.

Life
Dąmbski was the second son of Adam Dąmbski, hrabia (count) of Lubańiec, castellan of Słońsk (died 1660), and Elżbieta Jemielska of Jemielna. The Dąmbskis, an ancient noble family from Inowrocław and Brześć Kujawski, used the Godziemba coat of arms.

After graduating from Kraków Academy, Dąmbski served as secretary to King Michał Korybut Wiśniowiecki. In 1673 Dąmbski became bishop of Chełm, and in 1676 was appointed bishop of Łuck. By 1682 he was bishop of Płock, and in 1692 became bishop of Kujawy.

These episcopal positions provided Dąmbski with immense wealth.  He donated to Wawel Cathedral a monstrance studded with precious stones, which remains in the cathedral treasury. He spared no expense sumptuously renovating a number of churches. He founded the Jesuit school in Toruń, constructed the cathedral in Łuck and in 1693 built the Dąmbski Palace in Toruń, which features a fine Baroque facade.  He also bought the manor of Kaczkowo (including eight villages) in Inowrocław county in 1670, where he built a summer palace. Between 1679 and 1681, he acquired lands near Iłów comprising a town and 10 villages in the counties of Gostynin and Sochaczew.

Political life

Dąmbski participated actively in Poland's political life. In the 1674 royal elections, Dąmbski was leader of the anti-French faction, throwing his support behind hetman Jan Sobieski, who ascended the throne as Jan III (died in 1696).

Dąmbski played a key role in the subsequent royal election, which has been described as "one of the most dismal episodes in Polish parliamentary history." Initially  Dąmbski backed the late king's son, Jakub Sobieski,  however, Sobieski was in Silesia at the time of his father's death, and was immediately seized by Saxon troops. Dąmbski then joined supporters of the Russian-backed candidate, Friedrich August, Elector of Saxony. Despite enormous bribes paid by the Elector and his backers, the Elector's Protestantism aroused suspicions among the Polish nobility. Although the Elector promised to convert to Roman Catholicism, on 27 June 1697, the Polish nobility elected the French candidate, the Prince de Conti, and the Primate proclaimed Conti king.

Nevertheless, that same evening a group of dissenters, led by Dąmbski held a second vote, in the absence of the Primate, who had not returned to the election field. Dąmbski therefore proclaimed the Elector King of Poland. The Elector arrived in short order and on September 15, Dąmbski crowned the Elector king August II of Poland in Wawel Cathedral. It was the first time that a deceased monarch's son had not been elected to succeed him, that the rightful candidate had been disbarred from the throne by military force, and that the Poles had acquired a German king, which went against a long tradition of keeping German hegemony at arm's length." A grateful King August II nominated Dąmbski bishop of Krakow on 30 March 1700. However, before he could be installed, Dąmbski died suddenly. He was buried in the Saints Peter and Paul Church, Kraków.

Table of contents

References

Jagiellonian University alumni
Bishops of Kujawy and Włocławek
Ecclesiastical senators of the Polish–Lithuanian Commonwealth
Bishops of Płock
People from Toruń
Bishops of Kraków
1630s births
1700 deaths
Year of birth uncertain
17th-century Roman Catholic bishops in the Polish–Lithuanian Commonwealth